The motion history image (MHI) is a static image template helps in understanding the motion location and path as it progresses. In MHI, the temporal motion information is collapsed into a single image template where intensity is a function of recency of motion. Thus, the MHI pixel intensity is a function of the motion history at that location, where brighter values correspond to a more recent motion. Using MHI, moving parts of a video sequence can be engraved with a single image, from where one can predict the motion flow as well as the moving parts of the video action.

Some important features of the MHI representation are:
 It represents motion sequence in a compact manner. In this case, the silhouette sequence is condensed into a grayscale image, where dominant motion information is preserved. 
 MHI can be created and implemented in low illumination conditions where the structure cannot be easily detected otherwise. 
 The MHI representation is not so sensitive to silhouette noises, holes, shadows, and missing parts. 
 The gray-scale MHI is sensitive to the direction of motion because it can demonstrate the flow direction of the motion. 
 It keeps a history of temporal changes at each pixel location, which then decays over time. 
 The MHI expresses the motion flow or sequence by using the intensity of every pixel in a temporal manner.

General algorithm

 for each time t
     Bt := absolute_difference(It, It-1) > threshold
 end for
 
 for each time t
     for each pixel (x, y)
         if Bt(x, y) = 1
             MHIt(x, y) := τ
         else if MHIt-1 ≠ 0
             MHIt(x, y) := MHIt-1(x, y) - 1
         else
             MHIt(x, y) := 0
         end if
 end for

References

Computers